Viktor Einar Gyökeres  (born 4 June 1998) is a Swedish professional footballer who plays as a forward for Championship side Coventry City and Sweden national team.

He made his senior debut with Swedish side Brommapojkarna in 2015 with whom he made over 50 appearances before signing for Brighton three years later.

He has also represented Sweden at various youth levels and was the joint-top goalscorer at the 2017 UEFA European Under-19 Championship, before making his senior international debut in 2019.

Club career

IF Brommapojkarna
Gyökeres signed for Brommapojkarna from IFK Aspudden-Tellus in 2013 and joined up with the club's under-17 side. He progressed through the youth teams and made his senior debut two years later. He scored his first goals for the club on 20 August 2015, netting a brace in a 3–0 Svenska Cupen win over IF Sylvia. The following year, with the club having suffered relegation the season before, Gyökeres scored seven goals to help Brommapojkarna secure promotion back into the Superettan. He later helped Brommapojkarna into the semi-finals of the Svenska Cupen when he scored the winning goal in the quarter finals against top division side, Elfsborg. Brommapojkarna were unable to progress further, though, as they were beaten 4–0 by IFK Norrköping in the next round.

On 6 September 2017, having scored 10 league goals at the time, Gyökeres signed a two-and-a-half-year contract with Premier League side Brighton & Hove Albion with the deal to go through at the conclusion of the Superettan season. He ended the season with a return of 13 goals in 29 league appearances, including a hat-trick on the final day as Brommapojkarna secured promotion to the Allsvenskan as league champions.

Brighton & Hove Albion
Gyökeres officially joined Brighton on 1 January 2018 and began training with the club's under-23 side. He made his senior debut for the club on 28 August, starting in a 1–0 EFL Cup defeat to Southampton. On 26 January 2019, Gyökeres made his FA Cup debut coming on as a sub in a 0–0 draw at home to West Bromwich Albion.

In July 2019 he moved on loan to German second tier side FC St. Pauli for the 2019–20 season. On the opening day of the season he made his debut coming on as a sub in a 1–1 away draw to Arminia. Gyökeres scored his first goal for St Pauli on 29 September scoring the second in a 2–0 home victory over SV Sandhausen.

On 17 September 2020, Gyökeres scored his first goal for Brighton in a 4–0 victory against Portsmouth in the EFL Cup.

On 2 October 2020, Gyökeres joined EFL Championship side Swansea City on loan for the remainder of the 2020–21 season. He made his debut a day later, coming on as a substitute in a 2–1 home win over Millwall. He scored his first goal for the club on 9 January 2021, scoring the second in a 2–0 away win over Stevenage sending Swansea through to the fourth round of the FA Cup. He was recalled by Brighton on 14 January 2021.

Coventry City
Gyökeres joined Coventry City on loan on 15 January 2021. He made his debut four days later starting and playing 59 minutes of the 3–0 away loss at  Reading. He scored on his first appearance at St Andrew's netting the first in a eventual 2–0 victory over Sheffield Wednesday on 27 January, his first league goal in English football.

He returned to Coventry City on a permanent deal on 9 July 2021, after signing a three-year contract. 
Gyökeres scored in Coventry's opening game of the 2021–22 Championship season on 8 August, putting Coventry back level in an eventual 2–1 victory over Nottingham Forest in Coventry's first home game since April 2019 after ground sharing with Birmingham City. Gyökeres scored 17 goals in 45 league appearances for Coventry in the 2021–22 season.

In the 2022–23 Championship season he was named as the player of the month in November after scoring four goals in four games, leading Coventry to four straight wins during that period.

International career

Youth 
Gyökeres played youth football for Sweden at under-19 and under-21 level.

Gyökeres featured regularly for Sweden in the nation's qualification campaign for the 2017 UEFA European Under-19 Championship during which he scored twice, including the winning goal against Italy to help Sweden qualify for the tournament for the first time. He was then selected for the squad which took part in the tournament in Georgia and scored in all three of Sweden's group matches but was unable to help the nation progress to the knockout stages of the tournament. His return of three goals later saw him share the Golden Boot award with England's Ben Brereton and Ryan Sessegnon, and the Netherlands' Joël Piroe.

Senior 
On 8 January 2019, Gyökeres made his senior international debut for the Sweden in a 0–1 loss against Finland. Just three days later, Gyökeres scored his first senior goal for Sweden in a 2–2 draw vs Iceland.

In October 2021, after scoring 9 goals in 11 EFL Championship games for Coventry, Gyökeres was called up to the Swedish national team to replace Zlatan Ibrahimovic to face Kosovo and Greece for the 2022 World Cup qualifiers.

Personal life
He is of Hungarian origin.

Gyökeres is in a relationship with Amanda Nildén who is a female professional footballer. Upon his transfer to Brighton in 2018, Nildén moved with him to England and impressed enough to secure a spot in the club's ladies team.

Career statistics

Club

International

Scores and results list Sweden's goal tally first, score column indicates score after each Gyökeres goal.

Honours
IF Brommapojkarna
Superettan: 2017
Individual
UEFA European Under-19 Championship Golden Boot: 2017

References

External links
  (archive)
 

1998 births
Living people
Swedish footballers
IF Brommapojkarna players
Brighton & Hove Albion F.C. players
Superettan players
Association football forwards
Swedish expatriate footballers
Swedish expatriate sportspeople in England
Expatriate footballers in England
Sweden youth international footballers
IFK Aspudden-Tellus players
Swedish people of Hungarian descent
Sweden international footballers
FC St. Pauli players
Swedish expatriate sportspeople in Germany
Expatriate footballers in Germany
2. Bundesliga players
Swansea City A.F.C. players
Coventry City F.C. players
Swedish expatriate sportspeople in Wales
Expatriate footballers in Wales
English Football League players
Sweden under-21 international footballers